Ali Shan (born 17 October 1994) is a Pakistani cricketer who plays for Central Punjab. He made his first-class debut for Faisalabad in the 2017–18 Quaid-e-Azam Trophy on 26 September 2017. In September 2019, he was named in Central Punjab's squad for the 2019–20 Quaid-e-Azam Trophy tournament. In January 2021, he was named in Central Punjab's squad for the 2020–21 Pakistan Cup.

References

External links
 

1994 births
Living people
Pakistani cricketers
Faisalabad cricketers
Place of birth missing (living people)
Central Punjab cricketers